Metropolitan Philaret (secular name Vasily Mikhaylovich Drozdov, Василий Михайлович Дроздов; 26 December 1782 – 1 December 1867) was Metropolitan of Moscow and Kolomna and the most influential figure in the Russian Orthodox Church for more than 40 years, from 1821 to 1867.

He was canonized on 13 October 1994 and his feast day is celebrated on November 19.

Life
He was born in Kolomna as Vasily Drozdov. His father was a member of the clergy. Vasily was educated at the seminary of Kolomna, where courses were taught in Latin; and then at the Troitse-Sergiyeva Lavra, and on the completion of his studies was at once appointed professor in the latter. He became preacher of the lavra in 1806, and in 1808, received the monastic tonsure and was named Philaret after Saint Philaret the Merciful. In 1809 he was appointed professor of theology in the ecclesiastical academy of Alexander Nevsky Lavra in St. Petersburg, becoming archimandrite in 1811 and director in 1812.

The Events of 1812 produced a strong impression on Philaret; he explained the success of the Russians by moral reason and read a lecture on this theme in the "Society of friends of the Russian word". In 1813 he declaimed his famous speech on Kutuzov's death.

He took monastic vows in 1817, and was soon consecrated bishop of Reval and then episcopal vicar of St. Petersburg. In 1819, he became Archbishop of Tver and a member of the Most Holy Synod. In the following year he was archbishop of Yaroslavl, and in 1821 was translated to Moscow, also becoming metropolitan in 1826.

His daring utterances, however, brought him into imperial disfavor from 1845 until the accession of Alexander II. In 1855 he was restricted to the limits of his diocese. He is said to have prepared Alexander's proclamation freeing the serfs, and he enjoyed the reputation of being one of the leading pulpit orators of his time and country.

He was the spiritual father of missionary hieromonk Macarius (Glukharyov) (1792–1847), canonized in 2000 for his role as "Apostle to the Altai".

Philaret was responsible for some of the worst offences towards the Old Believers, including the misappropriation of churches and the sealing of the altars at the churches of the Rogozhskoye Cemetery, which was the administrative and spiritual center of the Belokrinitskoe Soglasie Old Believers. Philaret was also directly involved in the imprisonment of Old Believer hierarchs and monastics.

Works
Filaret was a prominent figure in preparing a Russian translation of the Bible (until his time, only a Church Slavonic version not readily understood by the general populace was available), and wrote many volumes of theological and historical works collectively known as the Filaretica. They include the Colloquy between a Believer and a Skeptic on the True Doctrine of the Greco-Russian Church (St. Petersburg, 1815); Compend of Sacred History (1816); Commentary on Genesis (1816); Attempt to Explain Psalm lxvii. (1818); Sermons delivered at Various Times (1820); Extracts from the Four Gospels and the Acts of the Apostles for Use in Lay Schools (1820); Christian Catechism (1823); Extracts from the Historical Books of the Old Testament (1828–30); Principles of Religious Instruction (1828); and New Collection of Sermons (1830–36). Filaret also wrote spiritual poems from an early age; his poetical correspondence with Pushkin is well known.

References

 
 Nicholas S. Racheotes. The life and thought of Filaret Drozdov, 1782–1867: the thorny path to sainthood. Lanham, Maryland: Lexington, 2019. XXVI, 307 pp.

External links
 Collection of links 
 Metropolitan Filaret and the Russian religious philosophy 
 Biography 
 

Bishops of the Russian Orthodox Church
Filaret
Filaret
Members of the Russian Academy
Full members of the Saint Petersburg Academy of Sciences
Honorary members of the Saint Petersburg Academy of Sciences
Filaret
Filaret
Russian saints
19th-century Christian saints
19th-century Eastern Orthodox theologians